The Beech Street School, is located in Ridgewood, Bergen County, New Jersey, United States. The schoolhouse was built in 1895 and added to the National Register of Historic Places on March 12, 1998. The building is an example of the Romanesque Revival style of architecture.

See also
National Register of Historic Places listings in Bergen County, New Jersey

References

Defunct schools in New Jersey
National Register of Historic Places in Bergen County, New Jersey
Ridgewood, New Jersey
School buildings on the National Register of Historic Places in New Jersey
School buildings completed in 1895
Schools in Bergen County, New Jersey
New Jersey Register of Historic Places